The 1915 Carlisle Indians football team represented the Carlisle Indian Industrial School as an independent during the 1915 college football season. Led by Victor Kelly in his first and only season as head coach, the Indians compiled a record of 3–6–2 and were outscored opponents 196 to 85.

Schedule

References

Carlisle
Carlisle Indians football seasons
Carlisle Indians football